Richmond is a civil parish in Carleton County, New Brunswick, Canada, located west of Woodstock. It comprises one local service district (LSD) and parts of two others, all of which are members of the Western Valley Regional Service Commission (WVRSC).

The census subdivision of Richmond Parish shares the civil parish's borders.

Origin of name
The parish may have been named in honour of the Duke of Richmond, Governor General of British North America 1818-1819, as the area was opened for settlement in 1817.

Another possibility is that some of the early settlers came from Richmond, New York.

History
Richmond was erected in 1853 from the western part of Woodstock Parish.

Boundaries
Richmond Parish is bounded:

 on the west by the international border,
 on the north by the Meduxnekeag River,
 on the east by the second tier of land grants west of the Saint John River,
 on the south by a line true east from Boundary Monument No. 1 to the Eel River, then downstream to the Woodstock Parish line.

Local service districts
All LSDs assess for street lighting and community & recreation services in addition to the basic LSD services of fire protection, police services, land use planning, emergency measures, and dog control.

Richmond Parish
The local service district of the parish of Richmond comprises all of the parish north of Debec. It also included a small wetland area west of the mouth of Fish Creek until 2014.

The parish LSD was established in 1966 to assess for fire protection following the abolition of county government by the new Municipalities Act. Community services were added in 1967 and recreational facilities in 1995.

The taxing authority is 212.00 Richmond.

LSD advisory committee: Unknown.

Debec
The local service district of Debec Consolidated School District comprises most of Richmond Parish south of Curries Lake as well as a very irregular area along the western side of Woodstock Parish, extending as far east as the junction of Dugan and Critter Roads. The school district extended into North Lake Parish, unlike the current LSD.

Debec was established in 1966 to assess for fire protection for the whole LSD and for street lighting at Debec Junction. Community services were added in 1967, recreational facilities and first aid & ambulance service in 1972.

The taxing authorities are 213.01 Debec Inside (the street lighting area) and 2013.02 Debec Outside.

LSDAC: Yes, as of 28 May 2020. Chair Jim Kennedy served on the WVRSC board from at least 2015 until June 2018. Chair Lucas Flemming replaced Kennedy on the WVRSC board in June 2018 but was not listed as a member on the most recent board minutes.

Woodstock Parish
The local service district of the parish of Woodstock has included a small area of wetlands west of the mouth of Fish Creek since 2014. The taxing authority is 218.00 Woodstock.

Communities
Communities at least partly within the parish; italics indicate a name no longer in official use

 Blowdown
 Campbell Settlement
  Debec
 Elmwood
 Elmwood Station
 Green Road
 Houlton Road
 Irish Settlement
 Kirkland
  Limestone
  McKenzie Corner
 Monument
 Oak
 Oak Mountain
 Plymouth
 Richmond Corner
 Union Corner
 Watson Settlement
 Wickham

Bodies of water
Bodies of water at least partly in the parish:

 Eel River
 Meduxnekeag River
 Bull Creek
 Curries Lake
 Greens Lake
 Henderson Lake
 Morrison Lake
 Saunderson Lake
 Sherwood Lakes

Other notable places
Parks, historic sites, and other noteworthy places at least partly in the parish.
 Belleville Protected Natural Area
 Hovey Hill Protected Natural Area
 Meduxnekeag Valley Protected Natural Area
 Oak Mountain Protected Natural Area
 Smith Brook Protected Natural Area
  Woodstock Road

Demographics

Population
Population trend

Language
Mother tongue (2016)

See also
List of parishes in New Brunswick

Notes

References

Local service districts of Carleton County, New Brunswick
Parishes of Carleton County, New Brunswick